Numbered Woman is a 1938 American drama film. Directed by Karl Brown, the film stars Sally Blane, Lloyd Hughes,  Mayo Methot, and Clay Clement. It was released on May 22, 1938. Its working title during production was Private Nurse.

Cast list
 Sally Blane as Linda Morgan
 Lloyd Hughes as Dr. Steven Russell
 Mayo Methot as Vicki
 Clay Clement as Lew Adams
 J. Farrell MacDonald as Captain Ryan
 Mary Lawrence (actress) as Margie (as Mary Lender)
 John Arledge as Tommy Morgan
 Ward Bond as Detective
 Morgan Wallace as Blake
 Robert Fiske as Ferguson
 Ralph Dunn as Red

References

External links
 
 

1938 drama films
American drama films
American black-and-white films
1938 films
Monogram Pictures films
1930s English-language films
1930s American films